Pomellato is an Italian jewelry company. The brand was founded by Pino Rabolini in Milan in 1967 and currently ranks among the top five European jewellers by sales. In 2013, the brand became a part of the luxury group Kering.

History
Pomellato began operating in 1967, introducing the concept of prêt-à-porter jewellery, the idea that jewellery is not just a status symbol but an accessory to be worn at any moment of the day and changed like clothes. In the 1990s, Pomellato particularly focused on using colored stones. The company has also made its mark in producing chains.

In 2007, to celebrate its 40th year, Pomellato made its debut in high-end jewellery with the launch of the Pom Pom collection: 40 pieces sold by appointment in New York, Paris, Milan and Monte Carlo.

In October 2009, Andrea Morante became the new chief executive officer of the group and minority shareholder of RA.MO, the holding company of the Rabolini family that controlled the Pomellato and Dodo brands.

In July 2013, Kering acquired Pomellato. Sabina Belli was appointed CEO of Pomellato group in December 2015.

Famous collections 
Nudo, Capri, Sabbia, M'Ama Non M'Ama, Iconica, Victoria, Tango.

International expansion 

Pomellato has more than thirty boutiques worldwide in Milan, Paris, Madrid, Capri, Barcelona, Monte Carlo, Taipei, Venice, Rome, Singapore, Moscow, Düsseldorf, Verona, Florence, Antwerp, Dubai, New York City, Turin, Kuwait, Moscow, London, Miami, Munich, Jeddah, Hamburg, Chicago, Beijing and Beirut.

Design characteristics 
Pomellato jewels have very recognisable features: the emphasis on rounded and tactile forms. The pavé given an irregular, random style by using gemstones of various sizes and/or colours. Openwork, also on jet.

Dodo 
In 1995, Pomellato launched a second brand, Dodo. The name Dodo was chosen as an extinct species exemplifying the need to protect nature.

Communication 
The Pomellato campaigns of the 1960s were entrusted to Franco Scheichenbauer. In 1971, Pomellato started working with the master of black-and-white photography, Gian Paolo Barbieri. From 1982 to 1984, Pomellato campaigns were signed by the photographer Helmut Newton. Gian Paolo Barbieri returned in 1988 and 1989, in charge of traditional advertising campaigns and also broader projects like the books “The Maps of Desire”, 1989 and the more recent “Innatural” of 2004, where the jewellery was photographed in tropical settings.
The 1990s saw a succession of photographers like Alistair Taylor Young, Lord Snowdon and Javier Vallhonrat. In 2001, Pomellato departed from black-and-white photography to embrace colour with the work of Michel Comte. After Paolo Roversi, author of the 2010 campaign, 2011 saw the comeback of Javier Vallhonrat, portraying the Pomellato's celebrity spokeswoman, Tilda Swinton, in the campaign of the maison.

The Kabul project 
In the two-year period 1994–1995, Pomellato sponsored a charity project: “Shots”, a gallery of portraits by Michel Comte involving dozens of celebrities in the movie and fashion worlds, who donated the Pomellato jewel worn for charity purposes to support a project for building a hospital in Kabul. This project saw the participation of Geraldine Chaplin, Claudia Cardinale, Isabella Rossellini, Antonio Banderas, Boy George, Salma Hayek, Monica Bellucci and many others. The very special patroness of the auction “Bijoux et portraits de star” was Catherine Deneuve.

Curiosities 
The name Pomellato is taken from the image of a small horse head that featured on the corporate hallmark used in the atelier.

References

 Massinelli A.M., Pomellato,  Leonardo Arte - Electa, Italian text April 1999,  pp. 193, 250 col. ill., cm 25x33. Hardcover .  English edition 31 October 1999

External links

Italian jewellers
Jewellery companies of Italy
Jewellery retailers of Italy
Fashion accessory brands
Luxury brands
High fashion brands
Retail companies established in 1967
Italian companies established in 1967
Companies based in Milan
Italian brands
Kering brands
2013 mergers and acquisitions